Kewdale is a suburb of Perth, Western Australia within the City of Belmont. Kew Street was one of the first roads in this district, hence the naming of the suburb.

Geography 
Kewdale is bounded by Cloverdale and Perth Airport to the north, Belmont to the east and Welshpool and Carlisle to the south. The suburb is a mixture of residential to the west with commercial and industrial areas to the east. A number of notable parks and reserves can be found in the area including Tomato Lake, Willow Lake Park, Wicca Reserve, Peet and Peachy parks and smaller Cottage and Nance Parks to the east.

Transport 
Kewdale is well serviced by several bus routes including 37, 38, 39, 270, 284, 285 and 293 which offer direct connections to Perth Airport, Elizabeth Quay bus station, Curtin University bus station, St Georges Terrace, Victoria Park transfer station, Oats Street railway station, Redcliffe railway station, Airport Central railway station and High Wycombe railway station.

The Kewdale residential area is bound by main roads such as Orrong Road, Abernethy Road and Leach Highway.

See also 
 Australian Islamic College, Kewdale
 Kewdale Freight Terminal 
 Kewdale Tavern

References 

Suburbs of Perth, Western Australia
Suburbs in the City of Belmont